Voices of Mississippi: Artists and Musicians Documented by William Ferris is a four-disc box set by William Ferris, released in 2018. The project earned Ferris two Grammy Awards for Best Historical Album and Best Album Notes.

References

2018 albums
Grammy Award for Best Historical Album